Saraband for Dead Lovers (released in the United States as Saraband) is a 1948 British historical drama film directed by Basil Dearden and starring Stewart Granger and Joan Greenwood. It is based on the 1935 novel by Helen Simpson. Set in seventeenth-century Hanover, it depicts the doomed romance between Philip Christoph von Königsmarck and Sophia Dorothea of Celle, the wife of the Elector of Hanover. The saraband mentioned in the title is a type of Spanish dance.

Jim Morahan, William Kellner and Michael Relph were nominated for the Academy Award for Best Art Direction - Set Decoration, Color.  It was the first Ealing Studios film shot in colour.

Plot summary
In 1682, Sophie Dorothea (Joan Greenwood) has an arranged marriage at age sixteen to Prince George Louis of Hanover and both parties are very unhappy with this political marital alliance.

She seeks solace from dashing Count Philip Konigsmark (Stewart Granger) when her husband Prince George Louis (Peter Bull), later to become King George I of Great Britain, wants nothing to do with her. The lovers are brought down by a jealous Countess Platen (Flora Robson), Philip's previous lover.

Cast

Stewart Granger as Count Philip Konigsmark
Joan Greenwood as Sophie Dorothea
Flora Robson as Countess Clara Platen
Françoise Rosay as The Electress Sophia
Frederick Valk as The Elector Ernest Augustus
Peter Bull as Prince George Louis
Anthony Quayle as Durer
Michael Gough as Prince Charles
Megs Jenkins as Frau Busche
Jill Balcon as Knesbeck
David Horne as Duke George William 
Mercia Swinburne as Countess Eleanore
Cecil Trouncer as Major Eck 
Noel Howlett as Count Platen
Barbara Leake as Maria, Clara's Maid 
Miles Malleson as Lord of Misrule 
Anthony Lang as Young Prince George 
Rosemary Lang as Young Princess Sophie 
Edward Sinclair as Nils 
Allan Jeayes as Governor of Ahlden 
Aubrey Mallalieu as Envoy at Ahlden 
Guy Rolfe as Envoy at Ahlden
Christopher Lee as Duke Anthony von Wolfenbuttel (scenes deleted)

Original novel
The novel, by Australian author Helen Simpson, was first published in 1935. It was the "book of the month" for the Evening Standard. Simpson adapted the novel into a play but died in 1940 before any production took place.

Production
Film rights were bought by Ealing Studios who announced in 1946 that they would make the film over the following year with Basil Dearden to direct. Stewart Granger signed to star and Ealing elected to make the movie in colour, their first such film.

Mai Zetterling was originally announced for the lead role. She then asked to be excused "on account of a domestic incident" (she fell pregnant) and Lilli Palmer was going to play the role instead. She was unable to make it to England in time so eventually Joan Greenwood played it.

Filming took place in June 1947 with exterior sequences shot in Prague and Blenheim Palace.

Stewart Granger later said:
Saraband was a sweet film... and it's one I'm quite proud of. But whereas Gainsborough loved stars, Ealing didn't like them; the production was the star. Saraband was their first big color film. I said I would do it, but I wanted Marlene Dietrich, whom I loved, for Clara. I felt I couldn't be brutal to Flora Robson. Flora was a great actress, but she'd never been beautiful and it was hard to be cruel to a woman who was never beautiful. That's why I wanted Dietrich for the part. The opening sequence was planned in great detail. Francoise Dosney wanted to rehearse... but in the end this wasn't used. You see, Koenigsmark, whom I played, was introduced as penniless, and this was cut out because it involved Jewish moneylenders.
(In August 1947 Variety reported that the script was being rewritten in order to comply with American censorship.)

Filming finished in October 1947. Anthony Steel has a small role; it was his first film.

Reception

Critical
George MacDonald Fraser, writing in 1988, said of the film,"Saraband tells the story [of Sophia and Konigsmark] with complete fidelity, and only the smallest of romantic touches, and makes an enthralling film of it. Stewart Granger (Konigsmark) was born for this kind of costume picture, and Joan Greenwood is an appealing Sophia. ... Best of all, the film conveys in a few brief scenes, the stifling monotony of court life in a pretentious little German state; in this too, Saraband is good history."

Box Office
The film was a box office disappointment. Michael Relph later said "it was a magnificent looking film, but it wasn't a success at the time. We were trying to get away from the Gainsborough-type romantic costume picture, which was totally unreal, and to do a serious historical epic. I think the public probably wasn't ready for it and also it ended up being a bit heavy."

Awards
The acclaimed production design and art direction (nominated for an Academy Award) was complemented by the cinematography by Douglas Slocombe. Slocombe and the production team chose a muted style of colour filming, which was not universally praised: opinions variously described it as unusual and different, or pretentiously symbolic and leaving exterior and interior shots poorly matched.

Popular culture
UK goth band Sex Gang Children have a song called "Saraband for Dead Lovers".

Notes

References

External links

Saraband for Dead Lovers at TCMDB
Review of film at Variety
Complete original novel at Project Gutenberg
Saraband for Dead Lovers at Letterbox DVD
Saraband for Dead Lovers at BFI Screenonline

1948 films
1940s historical drama films
Ealing Studios films
Films set in the 1680s
Films set in the 1690s
Films directed by Basil Dearden
Films produced by Michael Balcon
British war drama films
British romantic drama films
War romance films
Adultery in films
Films set in Germany
British films based on actual events
Films based on Australian novels
British historical drama films
Films shot in Prague
1940s war drama films
1948 romantic drama films
1940s British films